The Paris Sisters were a 1960s American girl group from San Francisco, best known for their work with record producer Phil Spector.

Career
The group consisted of lead singer Priscilla Paris (January 4, 1945 – March 5, 2004), her older sister Albeth Carole Paris, and their middle sister Sherrell Paris. They reached the peak of their success in October 1961 with the hit single "I Love How You Love Me", which peaked at No. 5 on the Billboard Hot 100 Chart, and sold over one million copies. Some of the group's other hit songs include the US Top 40 single "He Knows I Love Him Too Much" (March 1962, No. 34), "All Through The Night" (1961), "Be My Boy" (No. 56), "Let Me Be The One" (No. 87), and "Dream Lover" (No. 91).

The Paris Sisters appeared in the 1962 British rock film It's Trad, Dad! (released in the U.S. as Ring-a-Ding Rhythm) directed by Richard Lester. In the film, they performed the Spector-produced song "What Am I to Do?" Also early in the 1960s, the Paris Sisters sang the jingle for Diet Rite soda.

Sherrell Paris later served as a production assistant on The Price Is Right and as host Bob Barker's personal assistant until she was released in 2000.
 
Priscilla Paris died on March 5, 2004, from injuries suffered in a fall at her home in Paris. She was 59.

Albeth Paris died in Palm Springs, California, on December 5, 2014. She was 79.

Discography

Albums
Sing From the Glass House, Unifilms Records (1966)
Golden Hits of The Paris Sisters, Sidewalk Records (1967)
Sing Everything Under The Sun, Reprise Records (1967)
The Best of The Paris Sisters, Curb Records (2004)
The Complete Phil Spector Sessions, Varèse Sarabande (2006)
Always Heavenly, Ace Records (2016)

Singles
 "Ooh La La" / "Who's Arms Are You Missing" (Decca) (1954)
 "Huckleberry Pie" / "Baby, Honey, Baby" (Decca) (1955)
 "Truly" / "His And Hers" (Decca) (1955) with Gary Crosby
 "I Wanna" / "The Know-how" (Decca) (1955)
 "Lover Boy" / "Oh Yes, You Do" (Decca) (1955)
 "I Love You, Dear" / "Mistaken" (Decca) (1956)
 "Daughter, Daughter" / "So Much-So Very Much" (Decca) (1956)
 "Don't Tell Anybody" / "Mind Reader" (Decca) (1958)
 "Old Enough to Cry" / "(Don't Stop, Don't Stop) Tell Me More" (Imperial) (1957)
 "My Original Love" / "Someday" (Imperial) (1958)
 "Be My Boy" / "I'll Be Crying Tomorrow" (Gregmark) (1961)
 "I Love How You Love Me" / "All Through the Night" (Gregmark) (1961)
 "He Knows I Love Him Too Much" / "A Lonely Girl's Prayer" (Gregmark) (1962)
 "Let Me Be the One" / "What Am I to Do?" (Gregmark) (1962)
 "Yes – I Love You" / "Once Upon a While Ago" (Gregmark) (1962)
 "Dream Lover" / "Lonely Girl" (MGM) (1964)
 "Once Upon a Time" / "When I Fall in Love" (Mercury) (1964)
 "Always Waitin'" / "Why Do I Take It From You?" (Mercury) (1965)
 "Sincerely" / "Too Good to Be True" (Reprise) (1966)
 "You" / "I'm Me" (Reprise) (1966)
 "My Good Friend" / "It's My Party" (Reprise) (1966)
 "Some of Your Lovin'" / "Long After Tonight Is All Over" (Reprise) (1967)
 "Golden Days" / "Greener Days" (Capitol) (1968)
 "Stand, Naked, Clown" / "The Ugliest Girl in Town" (GNP Crescendo) (1968)

References

External links
Paris Sisters biography I
Paris Sisters biography II
Fanpage Tribute to Priscilla, Sherell & Albeth
Complete Paris Sisters discography and interview

American girl groups
American vocal groups
American pop music groups
Family musical groups
1954 establishments in California
Musical groups disestablished in 1968
Musical groups from San Francisco
Imperial Records artists
Mercury Records artists
Capitol Records artists
MGM Records artists